Wang Chenyang (born 8 January 2002) is a Chinese cross country skier.

Career
He represented China at the 2018 Winter Paralympics. He again represented China at the 2022 Winter Paralympics and won a gold medal in the men's 12.5 kilometre event, and a silver medal in the 4 × 2.5 kilometre mixed relay.

References 

Living people
2002 births
People from Shijiazhuang
Cross-country skiers at the 2018 Winter Paralympics
Cross-country skiers at the 2022 Winter Paralympics
Medalists at the 2022 Winter Paralympics
Paralympic gold medalists for China
Paralympic silver medalists for China
Paralympic medalists in cross-country skiing
21st-century Chinese people